Bejou Township is a township in Mahnomen County, Minnesota, United States. The population was 98 at the 2000 census.

Bejou is a corruption of bonjour, a French word meaning "hello".

Geography

Demographics
As of the census of 2000, there were 98 people, 37 households, and 29 families residing in the township. The population density was 2.6 people per square mile (1.0/km2). There were 49 housing units at an average density of 1.3/sq mi (0.5/km2). The racial makeup of the township was 90.82% White, 4.08% Native American, and 5.10% from two or more races.

There were 37 households, out of which 24.3% had children under the age of 18 living with them, 70.3% were married couples living together, and 21.6% were non-families. 16.2% of all households were made up of individuals, and 2.7% had someone living alone who was 65 years of age or older. The average household size was 2.65 and the average family size was 3.00.

In the township the population was spread out, with 22.4% under the age of 18, 2.0% from 18 to 24, 26.5% from 25 to 44, 33.7% from 45 to 64, and 15.3% who were 65 years of age or older. The median age was 45 years. For every 100 females, there were 117.8 males. For every 100 females age 18 and over, there were 123.5 males.

The median income for a household in the township was $30,938, and the median income for a family was $33,125. Males had a median income of $16,250 versus $27,500 for females. The per capita income for the township was $13,082. There were 11.8% of families and 4.8% of the population living below the poverty line, including no under eighteens and 80.0% of those over 64.

References

Townships in Mahnomen County, Minnesota
Townships in Minnesota